Hans Loh was a German fishing trawler that was requisitioned by the Kriegsmarine in the Second World War for use as a Vorpostenboot, serving as V 402 Hans Loh and V 406 Hans Loh. She struck a mine and sank in the Gironde Estuary in August 1944.

Description
The engine was built by Deutsche Schiff- und Maschinenbau, Wesermünde, Germany and was rated at 96nhp. It drove a single screw propeller via double reduction gearing and a hydraulic coupling.

History
Hans Loh was built as yard number 565 by Deutsche Schiff- und Maschinenbau, Wesermünde. She was launched on 23 November 1936 and completed on 7 January 1937. She was built for Grundmann & Gröschel, Wesermünde.  The Code Letters DFCQ were allocated, as was the fishing boat registration PG 506.

On 17 September 1939, she was requisitioned by the Kriegsmarine and commissioned with 4 Vorpostenflotille as the Vorpostenboot V 402 Hans Loh. On 16 October 1939, she was redesignated V 406 Hans Loh. On 18 August 1942, she struck a mine and sank in the Gironde Estuary with the loss of eighteen of her crew.

References

Sources

1936 ships
Ships built in Bremen (state)
Fishing vessels of Germany
Steamships of Germany
Auxiliary ships of the Kriegsmarine
Maritime incidents in August 1944
Shipwrecks in the Bay of Biscay